The Son of No One is a 2011 American crime thriller film written by Dito Montiel based on a book of the same name, written by Montiel. The film is Dito Montiel's third collaboration with actor Channing Tatum.

Plot
In 2002, a young cop, Jonathan White, is a rookie officer under Captain Marion Mathers in a Queens neighborhood in New York City, where he grew up. To provide for his wife Kerry and ailing young daughter, he works hard to keep his life on track, but this life is threatened when a dark secret bubbles to the surface. An anonymous source reveals new information about two unsolved murders from 1986, in the same neighborhood. In 1986, 14-year-old Jonathan killed two men in self-defense. His friends Vinnie and Vicky helped him dispose of the bodies and keep their involvement a secret from the authorities. The detective on the case, Stanford, knew Jonathan was involved, but disposed of the evidence out of loyalty to Jonathan's late father, who had been his partner. The boyfriend of Vinnie's mother forced Vinnie to have sex with him. Vinnie and Jonathan decided to rob the man and escape, but their plan failed.

In the present, Jonathan meets with Vinnie, who has descended into mental illness, for the first time in years. He has been getting anonymous phone calls and letters threatening to expose what he did 16 years before. He contacts Loren Bridges, the reporter who is trying to create a newspaper story out of the source material that has been leaked. He tries to convince her not to publish the story, but she refuses and leaves. Once she leaves the restaurant, she is followed and murdered by an unseen assailant. When Kerry demands to know what is going on, Jonathan admits to her that he was responsible for the killings.

The next morning, Jonathan learns of Loren's death before he receives a call from Captain Mathers, who informs him that Jonathan's partner is waiting for him outside. He is taken to Mathers and Stanford, who is now the city's police commissioner and plans to hand the job to Mathers after he retires. Mathers shows pictures taken of Jonathan and Loren in the restaurant before her death. Mathers and Stanford tell him that they had Loren killed to prevent her from publishing the story and making the department look bad; they then threaten to frame him for her murder unless he cooperates.

Jonathan heads home, but soon turns around and drives to Vinnie's apartment, knowing that Mathers and Stanford are going to kill him. He arrives to find the men about to murder Vinnie on the roof. Jonathan tries to intervene, but his partner holds him back, and Mathers shoots and wounds him. Mathers hands a gun to Vinnie and orders him to kill Jonathan, but Vinnie decides instead to shoot Mathers. Stanford then shoots Vinnie, who falls off of the roof. Stanford tells Jonathan to leave and forget about everything that happened. Jonathan reluctantly leaves and goes to find a dying Vinnie, who tells him that he never told anyone what happened.

Mathers' death and the two murders in 1986 are blamed on Vinnie, who is portrayed as a mentally unstable murderer in the media. Jonathan tries to carry on a normal life. The movie closes with an older Vicky sending a letter to Jonathan, explaining this will be her last letter—thus identifying herself as the person sending the letters to the newspaper.

Cast
 Channing Tatum as Jonathan White
 Tracy Morgan as Vincent Carter ("Vinnie")
 Katie Holmes as Kerry White
 Ray Liotta as Captain Marion Mathers
 Juliette Binoche as Loren Bridges
 Al Pacino as Detective Charles Stanford
 James Ransone as Thomas Prudenti

Production
Filming took place from February 2010 to April in Astoria, Queens, NY.  Several scenes were shot in the Queensbridge Houses in Long Island City.

Release
The film was selected to close the 2011 Sundance Film Festival on January 30, 2011.  After a poor reception, the film's ending was recut.  Anchor Bay secured distribution rights to the film and released it in ten theaters.  It grossed $30,680 in the US and a total of $1.1 million worldwide.  It was released on DVD in the US on February 19, 2012.

Reception
The Son of No One provoked strong reactions at Sundance.  Although a private screening for distributors resulted in walkouts, the public showing was more positive.  Rotten Tomatoes, a review aggregator, reports that 16% of 37 surveyed critics gave the film a positive review; the average rating is 3.8/10.  The consensus states: "Needless stylistic flourishes and wholly illogical storytelling make The Son of No One a grisly, repugnant journey."  Metacritic rated it 36/100 based on 18 reviews.  Rob Nelson of Variety wrote, "Montiel's awkward appropriation of gritty crime-drama conventions results in a film that's contrived and implausible, at times absurdly so."  John DeFore of The Hollywood Reporter wrote that it "bounces nicely between two New York eras but is built around an unconvincing premise".  Writing for the Chicago Sun-Times, Roger Ebert rated it two out of four stars and said that the film "seems to be adding up, but its drama and urgency are without purpose." The New York Timess Stephen Holden wrote that the film features intense performances but a nonsensical plot.

Awards

References

Further reading

External links
 
 
 

2011 films
2011 action drama films
2011 thriller drama films
American action drama films
American thriller drama films
Films directed by Dito Montiel
Films scored by Jonathan Elias
Fictional portrayals of the New York City Police Department
Films about the New York City Police Department
Films based on the September 11 attacks
Films set in 1986
Films set in 2002
Films set in New York City
Films shot in New York City
2010s English-language films
2010s American films